Horsley and Horsley Woodhouse are civil parishes in the Amber Valley district of Derbyshire, England.  The parishes contain eight listed buildings that are recorded in the National Heritage List for England.  Of these, one is listed at Grade I, the highest of the three grades, and the others are at Grade II, the lowest grade.  The parishes contain the villages of Horsley and Horsley Woodhouse and the surrounding area.  The listed buildings consist of a church, a cottage, a farmhouse and farm buildings, the remains of buildings in the garden of a demolished house, a milepost, a water fountain, and a former post box.


Key

Buildings

References

Citations

Sources

 

Lists of listed buildings in Derbyshire